The Pattern may refer to:
 The Pattern (The Chronicles of Amber) is an inscribed labyrinth which gives the multiverse its order in The Chronicles of Amber.
 The Pattern (band), an American punk garage rock band.
 The Pattern (Fringe), a series of occurrences in the television series Fringe.
 The Pattern (app), a personality app

See also

 Pattern (disambiguation)